Hans Krister Nordin (born 25 February 1968) is a Swedish former professional footballer who played as a midfielder. He spent most of his career with Allsvenskan club AIK.

Club career 
Born in Stockholm, Nordin started playing football with local clubs IFK Bergshamra and Råsunda IS as a boy. He became a part of the youth setup at Djurgårdens IF in 1982, where he later made his senior debut. He won the 1990 Swedish Cup with Djurgården, before moving to league rivals AIK in 1992. He won the Allsvenskan championship in his first year at the club, and went on to win three Swedish Cups and a further Allsvenskan title. He won the 1999 Swedish Midfielder of the Year award, before leaving the club in winter 1999.

He moved to Brøndby IF in Denmark, who bought a number of Scandinavian players that year, under Norwegian manager Åge Hareide. In his two years in Brøndby, Nordin was named 2001 "Brøndby Player of the Year" and won the 2002 Danish Superliga championship. With the arrival of new manager Michael Laudrup in summer 2002, Nordin moved back to Sweden. He played a further two years with AIK, before ending his career with Ekerö IK in 2005.

International career 
He played two matches for the Sweden U21 team in 1990, including at the 1990 UEFA European Under-21 Championship where Sweden reached the semi-finals.

Honours 
Djurgårdens IF
 Svenska Cupen: 1989–90

AIK
 Allsvenskan: 1992, 1998
 Svenska Cupen: 1995–96, 1996–97, 1998–99

Brøndby IF
 Danish Superliga: 2001–02
Individual
 Swedish Midfielder of the Year: 1999
 Brøndby IF Player of the Year: 2001

References

External links
 AIK profile
 Brøndby IF profile

1968 births
Living people
Footballers from Stockholm
Association football midfielders
Swedish footballers
Sweden under-21 international footballers
Allsvenskan players
Danish Superliga players
Brøndby IF players
Djurgårdens IF Fotboll players
AIK Fotboll players
Swedish expatriate footballers
Expatriate men's footballers in Denmark
Swedish expatriate sportspeople in Denmark